Badminton at the 2019 Military World Games was held in Wuhan, China, from 21 to 26 October 2019. China dominated as the host nation, winning gold in almost all disciplines.

Medal summary

Women's doubles

Group A

Group B

Finals

Mixed doubles

Group A

Group B

Finals

Men's team

Standings

North Korea vs China

China vs Thailand

China vs South Korea

France vs China

South Korea vs North Korea

References 
 2019 Military World Games Results - Page 25

Badminton
2019
2019